Teclozan is an antiprotozoal agent. It is a dichloroacetamide.

References

Organochlorides
Antiprotozoal agents
Acetamides
Ethers